Dr Malcolm Alexander Ogilvie is a British ornithologist and freelance natural history author and consultant. One of his areas of expertise is wildfowl.

Ogilvie was a research scientist with the Wildfowl and Wetlands Trust from 1960 to 1986, also editing their journal, Wildfowl, from 1966  to 1986. Until 1997 he was a member of the British Birds editorial board and a member of the editorial board of the handbook The Birds of the Western Palearctic.  He has been a fully qualified bird ringer since 1958. He is a past regional representative for the British Trust for Ornithology, and is the vice-county plant recorder for South Ebudes for the Botanical Society of Britain and Ireland.

Ogilvie has been resident on the island of Islay since 1986.  He is married to Carol and has two daughters, Isla and Heather.

Qualifications
Member of the Society of Biology and a Chartered Biologist (MIBiol, CBiol) (1977)
Doctor of Philosophy (PhD), Bristol University (1983)

Positions
Ogilvie's positions have included:

Member, Gloucestershire Ornithological Advisory Committee, 1963–1986
Member, Ringing Committee, British Trust for Ornithology, 1970–1985
Member, West Areas Board, Scottish Natural Heritage, February 1991 - March 2001 (Deputy Chairman, August 1997 - March 2001)
Member, Scientific Advisory Committee, Scottish Natural Heritage, April 1994 - March 2001, and April 2005 - March 2010
Chairman, Editorial Committee, Scottish Ornithologists' Club, 1997–2002
Member, Committee for Scotland, Royal Society for the Protection of Birds, 1999–2004
Regional Representative for Islay, Jura & Colonsay, British Trust for Ornithology, 1989–2006
Member, Argyll Bird Records Panel, since 1990
Organiser, Wetland Bird Survey (formerly National Wildfowl Counts), Argyll, 1991–2006
Member, Argyll Raptor Study Group, since 1993
Secretary, Rare Breeding Birds Panel, 1993–2006
Rare Breeding Birds Panel representative on Scottish Raptor Monitoring Scheme, 2002–2006
Recorder, vice-county 102 (S Ebudes), Botanical Society of the British Isles, since 2004

Bibliography & references

Ornithology

Ducks of Britain and Europe (illustrated by Carol Ogilvie), Poyser (1975) The Winter Birds, Michael Joseph (1976) Wild Geese (illustrated by Carol Ogilvie), Poyser (1978) The Bird-Watcher's Guide to the Wetlands of Britain, Batsford (1979) Birdwatching on Inland Fresh Waters (illustrated by Carol Ogilvie) Severn House (1981), ;
 paperback edition (1983)Wildfowl of Britain and Europe (illustrated by Peter Scott and Noel Cusa), Oxford University Press (1986) Flamingos (illustrated by Carol Ogilvie), Alan Sutton (1986) Best Days with British Birds (with Stuart Winter), British Birds Ltd. 1989 The Birds of Islay (illustrated by Carol Ogilvie), Lochindaal Press, 1992
 second edition 1994
 third edition 2003Wildfowl: Hamlyn Bird Behaviour Guide (illustrated by Bruce Pearson), Hamlyn, (1994) Photographic Handbook: Wildfowl of the World (with Steve Young), New Holland (2002) Grebes of the World (illustrated by Chris Rose), Bruce Coleman Books (2002) Collect Birds on Stamps (5th edition, revised by Ogilvie), Stanley Gibbons, (2003) Birds of Islay - A Celebration in Photographs (with Gordon Langsbury), Lochindaal Press (2006) 

Other natural historyThe Wild Flowers of Islay : A Checklist, Lochindaal Press (1995)

OtherPlace Names of Islay: Their Meanings and Pronunciations'' compiled by Katie Ferguson and Margot Perrons, edited Ogilvie), Islay Museums Trust, (1990)

References

Bibliography

External links

British nature writers
British ornithologists
Living people
Year of birth missing (living people)